Labuhan Deli is a district in Deli Serdang Regency, North Sumatra, Indonesia. The district had a total population of 60,190 at the 2010 Census and 72,425 at the 2020 Census.

It covers an area of 127.23 sq.km, consisting of three physically unconnected sections; Helvetia and Manunggal are suburbs lying immediately to the west of Medan city; Pematang Johar is a suburb lying to the east of Medan city; Telaga Tujuh and Karang Gading are villages lying on a strip of land between Hamparan Perak district (Deli Serdang Regency) and Secanggang district (in Langkat Regency).

History
Labuhan Deli comes from the word "Harbour". Under the authority of the Deli Sultanate, this area is a part of the history of the Deli Kingdom. During the Dutch colonial era this area was a center of trade and other activities. After the independence of the Republic of Indonesia on 17 August 1945 the Deli Kingdom became part of the Deli Serdang Regency, a combination of the Deli Sultanate and the Serdang Sultanate. After the independence of the Republic of Indonesia, the development of rapid growth of the city of Medan as the capital of North Sumatra Province led to an expansion of the city as a center of government, trade and industrial center, so that in 1974 most of the villages in Labuhan Deli District became part of the Medan City administration. From 1974 Labuhan Deli District only consisted of four villages, namely Helvetia Village, Pematang Johar Village, Telaga Tujuh Village and Karang Gading Village. Then in 1995 Helvetia Village was divided into two villages, namely Manunggal and Helvetia Villages so that from 1995 the district consists of five villages listed below with their areas and their populations at the 2010 Census and the 2020 Census.

Address of Head of District Office "JL. VETERAN NO. 21 HELVETIA KECAMATAN LABUHAN DELI, KABUPATEN DELI SERDANG, POST CODE: 20373"

References

Districts of North Sumatra